Tokyo-Ga is a 1985 documentary film directed by Wim Wenders, about Japanese filmmaker Yasujirō Ozu. An international co-production of the United States and West Germany, the film was shot in spring 1983. Its focus ranges from explicit explorations of Ozu's filmmaking—Wenders interviews Ozu's regular cinematographer, Yuharu Atsuta, and one of Ozu's favorite actors, Chishū Ryū—to scenes of contemporary Tokyo, featuring pachinko machines and plastic food displays. Wenders introduces the film as a "diary on film."

Tokyo-Ga was screened in the Un Certain Regard section at the 1985 Cannes Film Festival.

Sections 
Reflections on Ozu
Tokyo
The center of the world
Chishū Ryū
Mu
Amusements
Wax food
Searching for images
Trains
Yuharu Atsuta
A good-bye

References

External links 
 
 
 

1985 films
Films directed by Wim Wenders
Documentary films about film directors and producers
West German films
1980s German-language films
1980s Japanese-language films
1985 documentary films
German documentary films
American documentary films
Films set in Tokyo
Films shot in Tokyo
Yasujirō Ozu
Films scored by Laurent Petitgand
Japan in non-Japanese culture
1980s English-language films
1980s American films
1980s German films